Semecarpus kraemeri, or Chuuk poisontree, is a species of plant in the family Anacardiaceae. It is endemic to the island of Chuuk within the Federated States of Micronesia.  A fellow endemic, the great Truk white-eye is thought to depend on this plant for survival.

References

kraemeri
Endangered plants
Endemic flora of the Federated States of Micronesia